Tunapuna is a parliamentary electoral district in Trinidad and Tobago. It has been represented since the 2020 general election by Esmond Forde of the People's National Movement (PNM).

Constituency profile 
The constituency was created prior to the 1956 general election. It had an electorate of 26,650 as of 2015. It is considered a marginal seat. Since the 2000 general election, the political party that has won the constituency has also won the general election.

Members of Parliament 
This constituency has elected the following members of the House of Representatives of Trinidad and Tobago:

Election results

Elections in the 2020s

Elections in the 2010s

References 

Constituencies of the Parliament of Trinidad and Tobago